Kiss of Love protest was a non-violent protest against moral policing which started  in Kerala, India, and later spread to other parts of India.

The movement began when a Facebook page called Kiss of Love called forth the youth across Kerala to participate in a protest against moral policing on November 2, 2014, at Marine Drive, Cochin. The movement received widespread support with more than 154,404 followers on its Facebook page. After the initial protest in Kochi, similar protests were organised in other major cities of the country.

It received opposition from various religious and political groups like Bharatiya Janata Yuva Morcha, SDPI, Vishva Hindu Parishad, Shiv Sena, Bajrang Dal and  Hindu Sena. On specific occasions but not exclusively, both the Supreme Court of India and Delhi High Court have made it clear that kissing in public is not an obscene act and no criminal proceedings can be initiated for kissing in public through a series of landmark judgments.

Background
There were several instances of moral policing in Kerala in the 2000s. In 2011, a 26-year-old youth was killed by a mob in Kodiyathur, Kerala, for allegedly having an affair with a married woman.

All of the accused were sentenced to life imprisonment in October 2014. In June 2014, a female theatre artiste and her male colleague were detained in police custody for traveling together at night, which stirred protests against moral policing on social media. In July 2013, police arrested a couple from a beach in Alappuzha for suspected “immoral activity” as the woman was not wearing any accessories to suggest that she was married.

In April 2013, an artist from Kochi was harassed by two policewomen when she went for a stroll on Marine Drive with a male friend. In June 2012,  a gang of men attacked and beat up a pregnant woman sitting alone in a bus shelter in Kannur.

The woman's husband had asked her to rest while  he went to a nearby ATM since she was heavily pregnant. In June 2011, An IT professional, on her way to work at Kochi's IT park, was accosted by a group of drunken men because she was riding pillion on a male colleague's bike. The drunken men argued with her, and then abused and slapped her. Several similar cases have been reported throughout Kerala.

The Kiss of Love protest was sparked off in October 2014 when Jai Hind TV, a Malayalam news channel owned by the Indian National Congress, telecast an exclusive report on alleged immoral activity at the parking space of Downtown Cafe in Kozhikode. The video showed a young couple kissing and hugging each other. A mob of attackers, who were later identified as belonging to the Bharatiya Janata Yuva Morcha vandalized the cafe following the report. Following this, a group of friends from a Facebook page called 'Freethinkers', started the Facebook page 'Kiss of Love'.  Activists from all over Kerala decided to protest against the series of moral policing incidents by organizing a public event at Marine Drive beach on November 2 in Kochi.

Beginning
On 2 November 2014, several activists gathered at Marine Drive, Kochi to express solidarity to the movement against moral policing. A peaceful march was planned from the campus of Ernakulam Law College to the venue during which the police took around 50 activists into preventive custody citing law and order issues. Various religious and political groups also gathered in the protest ground to physically prevent the activists from kissing and hugging in public.

Kerala Police was criticized for its failure to control the whole event. Police did not try to stop the counter protestors, including Shiv Sena, SDPI and Bajrang Dal members, from entering the protest venue even though many of the Shiv Sainiks were armed with canes to attack and forcefully remove the Kiss of Love protestors. Also, none of the counter protestors were removed even though they tried to physically stop the Kiss of Love protestors from legally protesting. Police later claimed that they arrested the Kiss of Love protestors to save the protestors' lives

Further activities
The protest was very popular on social networking sites and news media. The opposing groups allegedly compelled the Facebook authorities block the Kiss of Love page through mass reporting on November 3. The profile pages of all of the administrators were blocked as well. One of the administrators said that the page had 50,000 members at the time of blocking. The page was reinstated later that day and the number of members soon crossed 75,000. Supporters of the campaign have been posting pictures of them kissing on social networking sites.

Kollam-based women's rights activist Resmi R Nair was the co-founder and spokesperson of Kiss of Love protest. Another activist Rehana Fathima also participated in the protest along with her partner film-maker Manoj K Sreedhar.

A group of students at Maharaja's College, Ernakulam protested against moral policing by conducting an event named 'Hug of Love'. All the participants were later suspended for 10 days by the college authorities for violating the 'code of conduct'.

Another group of students from Government Law college Kozhikode Organized an event called Hug Of Love on 10/12/2014.Authorities took this as an act of indiscipline and served show cause notice to participants 
  
A protest against moral policing in Thiruvananthapuram with kisses and hugs under the banner 'kiss against fascism' was conducted in front of the Kairali theatre complex during the 19th International Film Festival of Kerala (IFFK) on 13 December 2014.

Kiss In The Streets
A Kiss protest dubbed as 'Kiss In The Streets' was organised on 7 December in Kozhikode. Right wing opponents of the kiss protest issued threats before the event, stating that protestors would be stripped naked in public, if they attempt to kiss.  The event was marred by violence towards the protestors by Shiv Sena and Hanuman Sena. Police resorted to caning and took the Kiss of Love protestors and their opponents into preventive custody. Protestors accused that Kerala Police were more brutal than the right wing assailants.

Outside Kerala
The event gathered support from educational institutions outside of Kerala including University of Hyderabad, JNU Delhi, IISER Kolkata, Pondicherry University, IIT Madras and IIT Bombay. Students from Jadavpur University and Presidency University, Kolkata have organised similar protests against moral policing in Kolkata on 5 November 2014. The Kolkata chapter also protested against the authorities of north Kolkata's Star Theatre for allegedly refusing entry to a 17-year-old girl because she was dressed in a skirt.

On November 8, a group of protestors demonstrated by kissing and hugging outside RSS headquarters in Delhi. While JNU students were at the forefront, there were representatives from several universities in the city like Delhi University, Jamia Millia Islamia, Ambedkar University Delhi and National Law University. Hindu Sena members arrived on the scene stating that the “ Western culture  was corrupting and degrading Indian culture”. Hindu Sena members tried to physically attack kissing couples. On November 9, a similar protest was organised by students in JNU campus, in solidarity with those who courted police action at the ‘Kiss of Love’ event in Kochi on November 2. A Kiss of Love event that was scheduled for 30 November in Bengaluru was cancelled when permission for protest was denied by Bengaluru Police.

Legality
Section 294(a) of Indian Penal Code states that "Whoever, to the annoyance of others, does any obscene act in any public place shall be punished with imprisonment for a term which may extend to three months, or with fine, or with both. IPC does not define the word 'obscene', hence it is interpreted differently by different authorities. The Supreme court has noted that "`obscenity' should be gauged with respect to contemporary community standards".

The court has also observed that the “standards of contemporary society in India are…fast changing” in Chandrakant Kalyandas Kakodar vs The State Of Maharashtra 1969. Regarding 'contemporary community standards', the Supreme court has noted that it is not “the standard of a group of susceptible or sensitive persons” that can be held as the standard of the community, in Aveek Sarkar vs State of West Bengal 2014. Regarding social morality, the Supreme court has observed that “Notions of social morality are inherently subjective and the criminal law cannot be used as a means to unduly interfere with the domain of personal autonomy” in Khushboo vs Kanniamal 2010. Now with regards to kissing and hugging in public places, the Supreme Court of India has made it clear that 'no case can be made out' of two people consensually hugging and/or kissing. Supreme Court gave this verdict in response to a petition filed by actor Richard Gere to quash the arrest warrant issued by a Jaipur court. The arrest warrant was issued  after the actor had taken Shilpa Shetty in his embrace and kissed her on the cheek at an AIDS awareness programme. A verdict by Delhi High Court has also made it clear that kissing in public is not a criminal offence.

Opposition
Kiss of Love was met with opposition and criticism from certain sections of Indian society. Several religious and political groups like Bharatiya Janata Yuva Morcha, SDPI, Sunni Yuvajana Sangham, Vishva Hindu Parishad, Shiv Sena, Bajrang Dal, Hindu Sena, Campus Front, Samastha Kerala Sunni Yuvajana Sanghom, Pattali Makkal Katchi, Hindu Makkal Katchi and Ernakulam wing of Kerala Students Union opposed this movement. These opposing groups claimed that public display of affection is against both Indian culture and the law of the land (under section 294 of the Indian Penal Code).  The Kerala State Women's Commission opposed Kiss of Love stating that it was against the culture of Kerala.

The proposed Kiss of Love event in Bengaluru received opposition from several quarters. Manjula Manasa, chairperson of the Karnataka State Women's Commission described the event as uncivilized. Akhil Bharatiya Hindu Mahasabha, several Congress and BJP leaders and various Hindutva proponents too opposed it. Bengaluru Police refused to give permission for the event stating that kissing is an obscene act. Pramod Muthalik of Sri Ram Sena, the organization behind 2009 Mangalore pub attack, has even threatened to take the law into his hands if the campaign is held.

Vigilante attacks
 In June 2014, a female theater artist and her male colleague were detained in police custody for traveling together at night, which stirred protests against moral policing on social media. Hima Shankar and her friend Sreeram Rameshand were arrested because they were traveling in a two-wheeler late at night. They were not released from the police station even after the parents came and clarified the issue.
 In July 2013, police arrested a couple from a beach in Alappuzha for suspected “immoral activity” as the woman was not wearing any accessories to suggest that she was married.
 A month earlier, police were accused of asking money from young couples travelling on motor cycles threatening that they will inform the girl's father.
 In June 2011, An IT professional, on her way to work at Kochi's IT park, was accosted by a group of drunken men because she was riding pillion on a male colleague's bike. The drunken men argued with her, and then abused and slapped her. Several similar cases have been reported throughout Kerala.
 In April 2013, an artist from Kochi was harassed by two policewomen when she went for a stroll on Marine Drive with a male friend.
 In February 2013, in Vatakara, Calicut, a 19-year-old boy died after being chased by a group of people for the crime of riding in a motorcycle with his girlfriend.  The girl was also wounded and was admitted to a hospital.
 On 23 October 2014, a restaurant in Calicut was attacked and vandalised. The attackers claimed that eatery was entertaining dating of unmarried couples. The attack came after a local Malayalam-language TV channel broadcast a report claiming that some coffee shops and restaurants in Kozhikode had become centres of “immoral activities”. 
 On 14 July 2015, a Madhyamam Daily journalist and her husband were attacked by a group at her office mistaking them for an unmarried couple. Later, a Communist Party of India (Marxist) leader was arrested for leading the attack.
 Mankada village in Malappuram attracted the attention of national newspapers in 2016 when a 42-year-old man was beaten to death by his neighbors for visiting his girlfriend in the night.

See also 
 Moral police
 SlutWalk
 Vigilante attacks in Kerala
 KISS OF LOVE AND ITS LEGALITY

References 

Social movements in India
Internet-based activism
Kissing
2014 in India
Protests in India
Kiss of Love protest
History of Kerala (1947–present)